Bhutan competed at the 1988 Summer Olympics in Seoul, South Korea.

Competitors
The following is the list of number of competitors in the Games.

Results by event

Archery

In its second Olympic archery competition, Bhutan sent only men.  As a team, they finished last.

Men

References

Official Olympic Reports

Nations at the 1988 Summer Olympics
1988
Olympics

sv:Bhutan i olympiska spelen